John Duncombe may refer to:
John Duncombe (Bury St Edmunds MP) (1622–1687), English politician, Chancellor of the Exchequer
John Duncombe (writer) (1729–1786), Church of England clergyman and writer
John Duncombe (Yarmouth MP), represented Yarmouth (Isle of Wight) (UK Parliament constituency)